Adhyayam Onnu Muthal is a 1985 Malayalam-language drama film, written by John Paul, directed by Sathyan Anthikad and starring Madhavi, Mohanlal, Soman, Balan K. Nair, Kaviyoor Ponnamma, Venu Nagavalli and Bahadur.

Plot
Seetha is from an aristocratic family and finds out that her aunt, father's sister is back in the village with her only son Vishnu. Seetha visits her aunt frequently without her family's knowledge as her family had severed ties with the aunt for marrying a Christian. Vishnu also reprimands Seetha for visiting his home frequently as he has only anger towards his mother's family. Seetha however develops feelings for her cousin Vishnu. However Vishnu does not reciprocate this feeling towards her. One day, Seetha her family finds out about this and Seetha's father Kesava Kuruppu forbids her to prolong this affair as he wants his daughter not to marry a man from a lower caste. Seetha is married off hastily to a bank employee Rameshan Nair against her wishes. Rameshan and his mother loves Seetha, but Seetha was lost in her world. Rameshan, the understanding husband gives Seetha enough time to cope, but loses hope one day and proposes to separate. Seetha realises her mistake and decides to start her life afresh. Rameshan leaves to office for the first time after wedding promising to come home early and take her outside. Seetha, all dressed up waits for her husband but a tragedy awaited her. Rameshan dies in a road mishap. Kuruppu, the determined man he is brings Seetha home against her wishes. He arranges her next marriage with Narayanan, a widower, who already has two children from his first marriage. Seetha herself lost in her sadness agrees and marries Narayanan. She makes herself happy by spending time with Narayanan's children. After a few days, her husband, who was a heart patient, dies. She has to leave that house after being harassed by Narayanan's annoying sister. She manages to find shelter in a maid servant's house. Her father realises this and his heart is broken. His close friend points out Kurup's mistake of not letting Seetha choose the man of her dreams in the name of family's honour. Kurup realises his mistake, goes to his sister's home and apologizes. Vishnu who is already heart broken seeing Seetha's fate tells his uncle that its never too late to rectify mistakes. In the climax, Vishnu goes to meet Seetha and admits his love for her.

Cast
 Madhavi as Seetha
 Mohanlal as Vishnu, Seetha's cousin
 Soman as Narayanan, Seetha's second husband
 Balan K. Nair as Kesava Kurup, Seetha's father
 Kaviyoor Ponnamma as Lakshmi, Vishnu's mother
 Venu Nagavalli as Rameshan Nair, Seetha's first husband
 Bahadur as Maash
 Kundara Johnny as Sreedharankutty
 Sukumari as Karthyayaniyamma
 Shubha
 Adoor Bhavani as Naniyamma, the maid servant
 Master Prasobh as Ravi (Sreekuttan), Narayanan's son
 Rohini as Rema

Soundtrack
The music was composed by Jerry Amaldev and the lyrics were written by M. D. Rajendran.

References

External links
 
 Adhyayam Onnu Muthal at the Malayalam Movie Database

1985 films
Films scored by Jerry Amaldev
1980s Malayalam-language films
1985 drama films
Films directed by Sathyan Anthikad
Indian drama films